In mathematics, a versor is a quaternion of norm one (a unit quaternion). The word is derived from Latin versare = "to turn" with the suffix -or forming a noun from the verb (i.e. versor = "the turner"). It was introduced by William Rowan Hamilton in the context of his quaternion theory.

Each versor has the form

where the r2 = −1 condition means that r is a unit-length vector quaternion (or that the first component of r is zero, and the last three components of r are a unit vector in 3 dimensions). The corresponding 3-dimensional rotation has the angle 2a about the axis r in axis–angle representation. In case  (a right angle), then , and the resulting unit vector is termed a right versor.

The collection of versors with quaternion multiplication forms a group, and the set of versors is a 3-sphere in the 4-dimensional quaternion algebra.

Presentation on 3- and 2-spheres

Hamilton denoted the versor of a quaternion q by the symbol Uq. He was then able to display the general quaternion in polar coordinate form
 q = Tq Uq,
where Tq is the norm of q. The norm of a versor is always equal to one; hence they occupy the unit 3-sphere in H. Examples of versors include the eight elements of the quaternion group. Of particular importance are the right versors, which have angle π/2. These versors have zero scalar part, and so are vectors of length one (unit vectors). The right versors form a sphere of square roots of −1 in the quaternion algebra. The generators i, j, and k are examples of right versors, as well as their additive inverses. Other versors include the twenty-four Hurwitz quaternions that have the norm 1 and form vertices of a 24-cell polychoron.

Hamilton defined a quaternion as the quotient of two vectors. A versor can be defined as the quotient of two unit vectors. For any fixed plane Π the quotient of two unit vectors lying in Π depends only on the angle (directed) between them, the same a as in the unit vector–angle representation of a versor explained above. That's why it may be natural to understand corresponding versors as directed arcs  that connect pairs of unit vectors and lie on a great circle formed by intersection of Π with the unit sphere, where the plane Π passes through the origin. Arcs of the same direction and length (or, the same, its subtended angle in radians) are equivalent, i.e. define the same versor.

Such an arc, although lying in the three-dimensional space, does not represent a path of a point rotating as described with the sandwiched product with the versor. Indeed, it represents the left multiplication action of the versor on quaternions that preserves the plane Π and the corresponding great circle of 3-vectors. The 3-dimensional rotation defined by the versor has the angle two times the arc's subtended angle, and preserves the same plane. It is a rotation about the corresponding vector r, that is perpendicular to Π.

On three unit vectors, Hamilton writes
  and
 
imply
 

Multiplication of quaternions of norm one corresponds to the (non-commutative) "addition" of great circle arcs on the unit sphere. Any pair of great circles either is the same circle or has two intersection points. Hence, one can always move the point B and the corresponding vector to one of these points such that the beginning of the second arc will be the same as the end of the first arc.

An equation
 
implicitly specifies the unit vector–angle representation for the product of two versors. Its solution is an instance of the general Campbell–Baker–Hausdorff formula in Lie group theory. Evidently versors are the image of the exponential map applied to a ball of radius π in the quaternion subspace of vectors.

Versors compose as aforementioned vector arcs, and Hamilton referred to this group operation as "the sum of arcs", but as quaternions they simply multiply.

The geometry of elliptic space has been described as the space of versors.

Representation of SO(3) 
The orthogonal group in three dimensions, rotation group SO(3), is frequently interpreted with versors via the inner automorphism  where u is a versor. Indeed, if

  and vector s is perpendicular to r,

then

 
by calculation.
Since quaternions can be interpreted as an algebra of two complex dimensions, the rotation action can also be viewed through the special unitary group SU(2).

For a fixed r, versors of the form exp(ar) where a ∈ , form a subgroup isomorphic to the circle group. Orbits of the left multiplication action of this subgroup are fibers of a fiber bundle over the 2-sphere, known as Hopf fibration in the case r = i; other vectors give isomorphic, but not identical fibrations. In 2003 David W. Lyons wrote "the fibers of the Hopf map are circles in S3" (page 95). Lyons gives an elementary introduction to quaternions to elucidate the Hopf fibration as a mapping on unit quaternions.

Versors have been used to represent rotations of the Bloch sphere with quaternion multiplication.

Elliptic space
The facility of versors illustrate elliptic geometry, in particular elliptic space, a three-dimensional realm of rotations. The versors are the points of this elliptic space, though they refer to rotations in 4-dimensional Euclidean space. Given two fixed versors u and v, the mapping  is an elliptic motion. If one of the fixed versors is 1, then the motion is a Clifford translation of the elliptic space, named after William Kingdon Clifford who was a proponent of the space. An elliptic line through versor u is  Parallelism in the space is expressed by Clifford parallels. One of the methods of viewing elliptic space uses the Cayley transform to map the versors to

Hyperbolic versor
A hyperbolic versor is a generalization of quaternionic versors to indefinite orthogonal groups, such as Lorentz group.
It is defined as a quantity of the form
 where 
Such elements arise in algebras of mixed signature, for example split-complex numbers or split-quaternions. It was the algebra of tessarines discovered by James Cockle in 1848 that first provided hyperbolic versors.

This versor was used by Homersham Cox (1882/83) in relation to quaternion multiplication. The primary exponent of hyperbolic versors was Alexander Macfarlane as he worked to shape quaternion theory to serve physical science. He saw the modelling power of hyperbolic versors operating on the split-complex number plane, and in 1891 he introduced hyperbolic quaternions to extend the concept to 4-space. Problems in that algebra led to use of biquaternions after 1900. In a widely circulated review of 1899, Macfarlane said:
...the root of a quadratic equation may be versor in nature or scalar in nature. If it is versor in nature, then the part affected by the radical involves the axis perpendicular to the plane of reference, and this is so, whether the radical involves the square root of minus one or not. In the former case the versor is circular, in the latter hyperbolic.
Today the concept of a one-parameter group subsumes the concepts of versor and hyperbolic versor as the terminology of Sophus Lie has replaced that of Hamilton and Macfarlane.
In the ordinary case, when  and − are antipodes on a sphere, the one-parameter groups have the same points but are oppositely directed. In physics, this aspect of rotational symmetry is termed a doublet.

In 1911 Alfred Robb published his Optical Geometry of Motion in which he identified the parameter rapidity which specifies a change in frame of reference. This rapidity parameter corresponds to the real variable in a one-parameter group of hyperbolic versors. With the further development of special relativity the action of a hyperbolic versor came to be called a Lorentz boost.

Lie theory

Sophus Lie was less than a year old when Hamilton first described quaternions, but Lie's name has become associated with all groups generated by exponentiation. The set of versors with their multiplication has been denoted Sl(1,q) by Robert Gilmore in his text on Lie theory. Sl(1,q) is the special linear group of one dimension over quaternions, the "special" indicating that all elements are of norm one. The group is isomorphic to SU(2,c), a special unitary group, a frequently used designation since quaternions and versors are sometimes considered anachronistic for group theory. The special orthogonal group SO(3,r) of rotations in three dimensions is closely related: it is a 2:1 homomorphic image of SU(2,c).

The subspace  is called the Lie algebra of the group of versors. The commutator product  just double the cross product of two vectors, forms the multiplication in the Lie algebra. The close relation to SU(1,c) and SO(3,r) is evident in the isomorphism of their Lie algebras.

Lie groups that contain hyperbolic versors include the group on the unit hyperbola and the special unitary group SU(1,1).

See also
 cis (mathematics)
 Quaternions and spatial rotation
 Rotations in 4-dimensional Euclidean space
 Turn (geometry)

Notes

References
 William Rowan Hamilton (1844 to 1850) On quaternions or a new system of imaginaries in algebra, Philosophical Magazine, link to David R. Wilkins collection at Trinity College, Dublin.
 William Rowan Hamilton (1899) Elements of Quaternions, 2nd edition, edited by Charles Jasper Joly, Longmans Green & Company. See pp. 135–147.
 Arthur Sherburne Hardy (1887) Elements of Quaternions, pp. 71,2 "Representation of Versors by spherical arcs" and pp. 112–8 "Applications to Spherical Trigonometry".
 Arthur Stafford Hathaway (1896) A Primer on Quaternions, Chapter 2: Turns, Rotations, Arc Steps, from Project Gutenberg
 Cibelle Celestino Silva, Roberto de Andrade Martins (2002) "Polar and Axial Vectors versus Quaternions", American Journal of Physics 70:958. Section IV: Versors and unitary vectors in the system of quaternions. Section V: Versor and unitary vectors in vector algebra.
 Pieter Molenbroeck (1891) Theorie der Quaternionen, Seite 48, "Darstellung der Versoren mittelst Bogen auf der Einheitskugel", Leiden: Brill.

External links
 Versor at Encyclopedia of Mathematics.
 Luis Ibáñez Quaternion tutorial  from National Library of Medicine

Spherical trigonometry
Quaternions
Rotation in three dimensions
William Rowan Hamilton